Santino Deng Wol is a South Sudanese military figure serving as the chief of defence forces of the South Sudan People's Defence Forces. He served as Lion Division commander from 2007-2017 and currently serving as the Assistant Chief of Defence Force for Administration, Finance and Personnel of South Sudanese army, SSPDF after being transferred from the post of Ground Force Commander. His hometown is Udhum which was part of Aweil West according to 10 states.

Military figure
Santino Deng Wol has been a commander of South Sudanese military branch known as "Division 3" or simply "Lion Division" cored in Wunyiek, Aweil East.
In 2014 during rebellion of Riek Machar with his fellow Nuers. Deng Wol carried out many attacks in residential areas of the rebel forces in Bentiu, Bor and Malakal. On 1 July 2015, Deng Wol was listed in United Nation sanctions alongside his fellow South Sudanese war commanders namely Marial Chengdong and Peter Gadet for torching civilians alive in houses, targeting civilians and killing civilians in religious bases. Wol's actions were connected to disruption of an agreed upon peace in the region. On 11 April 2021, Wol was named Chief of Staff of the South Sudan People's Defence Forces.

References

Living people
South Sudanese military personnel
People from Northern Bahr el Ghazal
Year of birth missing (living people)